Major General Sir Jeremiah Bryant  (bapt. 14 June 1783  – 10 June 1845) was a British Army officer in the Bengal Army.

Bryant was born in 1783 to Edward and Susannah Bryant. In 1832, he was living at Subathoo, British India, with his wife, Mary Anna Churchill, Lady Bryant. He lost an arm in battle.

His daughter Emily Susan Bryant married Arthur Lionel Tollemache. Their great-grandson was very briefly Edward Pelham-Clinton, 10th Duke of Newcastle at the end of his life. 

He is buried at St Peter's Church, Petersham.

References

1783 births
1845 deaths
Burials at St Peter's, Petersham
Companions of the Order of the Bath
British people in colonial India